Florian Rudy (born January 7, 1989) is a German footballer who plays as a striker for SV Heimstetten. He is the brother of Sebastian Rudy.

Career

Rudy played as a youth for four of southwest Germany's top clubs (VfB Stuttgart, 1899 Hoffenheim, 1. FC Kaiserslautern and Karlsruher SC), but it was with FC 08 Villingen of the Oberliga Baden-Württemberg that he made his breakthrough in senior football. He spent three and a half years with the club, making over a hundred appearances, before joining SpVgg Unterhaching of the 3. Liga in January 2012. He made his debut for the club a month later, as a substitute for Ömer Kanca in a 5–1 defeat to Chemnitzer FC, and made a further five appearances before the end of the season. After making no appearances during the first half of the 2012–13 season, he joined Regionalliga Bayern side SV Heimstetten on a six-month loan in January 2013. At the end of the season, the move was made permanent.

References

External links

1989 births
Living people
German footballers
SpVgg Unterhaching players
3. Liga players
Association football forwards
SpVgg Unterhaching II players
SV Heimstetten players
FC 08 Villingen players